Franz Wenninger (born 20 October 1910, date of death unknown) was an Austrian water polo player. He competed in the men's tournament at the 1936 Summer Olympics in Berlin, coming in sixth place.

References

External links
 

1910 births
Year of death missing
Austrian male water polo players
Olympic water polo players of Austria
Water polo players at the 1936 Summer Olympics
Place of birth missing